The Kaeson Youth Park is an amusement park located in Pyongyang, North Korea. The park,  located near the Kim Il Sung Stadium and in the west foot of Moran Hill was opened in 1984, the park was opened as part of the Triumphal Arch dedication.

In April 2010 the park was renovated, after which it was visited by Kim Jong Il. It was reported that riding all 10 amusements in the park costs 1,600 won.

A flying roller coaster, imported from Italy, opened in 2010. As of 2013, the rides on offer also included bumper cars, teacups, a swing ride and a double shot-like vertical drop.

See also 
 List of amusement parks in North Korea

Notes

External links 
 
 
 Kaeson Youth Park at the Roller Coaster DataBase

1984 establishments in North Korea
Amusement parks opened in 1984
Amusement parks in Pyongyang